Gerald Hauser (born 30 September 1961) is an Austrian politician who is a Member of the National Council for the Freedom Party of Austria (FPÖ).

References

1961 births
Living people
Members of the National Council (Austria)
Freedom Party of Austria politicians